present chairman of Hongō Gakuen, served as the international commissioner and member of the board of directors of the Scout Association of Japan, as well as a member of the Asia-Pacific Regional Scout Committee and a founding member of the World Buddhist Scout Brotherhood. Matsudaira retired from the post of International Commissioner on reaching the retirement age of 65 in 2003, and presently serves as president (Renmei-chō) of the Kagawa Scout Council.

In 2012, Matsudaira was awarded the 337th Bronze Wolf, the only distinction of the World Organization of the Scout Movement, awarded by the World Scout Committee for exceptional services to world Scouting. His father Yorihiro Matsudaira received the award in 1981.

Matsudaira, whose namesake was a daimyō of the Edo period, the fourth lord of Takamatsu, is the 14th head of the Matsudaira family. As a Scout, he traveled to Texas and New Mexico in the United States and was a guest on a military base. After graduation from Waseda University, he worked for Toshiba. One of his hobbies is horseback riding, he is an amateur radio aficionado, and he gives lectures about the advantages of Scouting activities.

Ancestry
Yoritake is a second cousin of the present head of the Tokugawa clan, Tokugawa Tsunenari, as both are great-grandsons of Nabeshima Naohiro, the  11th and last daimyō of Saga. By virtue of his descent from the kuge Madenokōji family, he is also a sixth cousin once removed of the present Emperor, Akihito.

References

 Scout Association of Japan publication celebrating the award of the Bronze Wolf to Yoritake Matsudaira
 inbox@apr Monthly e-Newsletter of World Scout Bureau Asia-Pacific Region, June 2004

External links

French Scoutopedia article
Bronze Wolf, World Scout Committee announces 'Bronze Wolf' awardees list for 2012
Full list of Japanese Bronze Wolf recipients 
Scout Association of Japan "Adults in Scouting" interview (2012) 

Recipients of the Bronze Wolf Award
Living people
1938 births
Scouting in Japan
Japanese educators
Waseda University alumni
Matsudaira clan
Amateur radio people